Stenoptilodes debbiei is a moth of the family Pterophoridae that is known from Ecuador.

Adults are on wing in June.

External links

debbiei
Moths described in 1996
Endemic fauna of Ecuador
Moths of South America